Demetrius II Aetolicus (Greek: Δημήτριος ὁ Αἰτωλικός) was the son of Antigonus II Gonatas and Phila who reigned as king of Macedonia from the winter of 239 to the spring of 229 BC.

Biography
Demetrius II belonged to the Antigonid dynasty and was born in 275 BC. He had already distinguished himself during his father's lifetime by defeating Alexander II of Epirus at Derdia and so saving Macedonia  There is a possibilitythat his father had already elevated him to position of power equal to his own before his death. If this had occurred it would be in 256 or 257 BC.

On his accession, Demetrius faced a coalition of enemies which included the two great leagues. Usually rivals, the Aetolian and Achaean Leagues now became allies against the Macedonian power. He succeeded in dealing this coalition severe blows, wresting Boeotia from their alliance. The revolution in Epirus, which substituted a republican league for the monarchy, gravely weakened his position.

During his reign, his kingdom extended into Euboea, Magnesia, Thessaly and its environs, excluding Dolopia and possibly Peparethos and Achaea Phthiotis.

In 236 BC, he invaded Boeotia, making the Boeotians submit immediately.

In 234 BC, due to a federal republic replacing the monarchy in Epirus, which led to the events of 231 BC, Demetrius hired Agron for military aid against the advancing Aetolians. His kingdom was not threatened by the Illyrian Ardiaei, ruled by Agron, despite them having gathered the greatest force in their history (c. 231 BC), but Epirus needed some sort of force to deter them.

At some point in 230-229 in an unknown location in north-west Macedonia, the Dardani defeated Demetrius who died shortly the next spring at the age of c. 45. His nine year old successor, the future Philip V, was deemed too young to rule by the Macedonian nobility and so Demetrius' half-cousin, Antigonus III Doson, was made regent. The exact location of Demetrius' tomb remains unknown, but was likely in Beroea or Aegae.

Marriage and family
Demetrius married four times, though the chronology of these marriages is a matter of dispute.

 Stratonice of Macedon, his aunt/cousin, the daughter of the Seleucid king Antiochus I and his aunt Stratonice, by whom he had a daughter called Apama III who married Prusias I of Bithynia. Stratonice left him after he married his second wife.
 Nicaea, the widow of his cousin Alexander of Corinth, c. 245/244 BC.
 Phthia (239 BC) the daughter of Alexander II of Epirus.
 Chryseis, probably a former war prisoner turned concubine, whom he married around 237 BC after they had a son, Philip V of Macedon. After Demetrius' death, she remarried his successor, Antigonus.

Informationregarding the life of Demetrius is drawn mainly from inscriptions, as only Plutarch writes of him, in Life of Aratus, and Polybius makes scarce mention of him.

Notes

229 BC deaths
3rd-century BC Macedonian monarchs
Ancient Macedonian monarchs
3rd-century BC rulers
Year of birth unknown
Antigonid dynasty